Manhattan is a city and county seat of Riley County, Kansas, United States, although the city extends into Pottawatomie County.  It is located in northeastern Kansas at the junction of the Kansas River and Big Blue River.  As of the 2020 census, the population of the city was 54,100.

The city was founded by settlers from the New England Emigrant Aid Company as a Free-State town in the 1850s, during the Bleeding Kansas era.  Nicknamed "The Little Apple" as a play on New York City's "Big Apple", Manhattan is  the home of Kansas State University and has a distinct college town atmosphere.

History

Native American settlement

Before settlement by European-Americans in the 1850s, the land around Manhattan was home to Native American tribes. From 1780 to 1830, it was home to the Kaw people, also known as the Kansa. The Kaw settlement was called Blue Earth Village (Manyinkatuhuudje), named after the river which the tribe had named the Great Blue Earth River, today known as the Big Blue River, which intersected with the Kansas River by their village. Blue Earth Village was the site of a large battle between the Kaw and the Pawnee in 1812.

The Kaw tribe ceded ownership of this land in a treaty signed at the Shawnee Methodist Mission on January 14, 1846.

1854: Polistra and Canton
The Kansas–Nebraska Act opened the territory to settlement by U.S. citizens in 1854. That fall, George S. Park founded the first Euro-American settlement within the borders of the current Manhattan. Park named it Polistra (some histories refer to it as Poliska or Poleska).

Later that year, Samuel D. Houston and three other pioneers founded Canton, a neighboring community near the mouth of the Big Blue River. Neither Canton nor Polistra ever grew beyond their original founders.

1855: Free-Staters
In March 1855, a group of New England Free-Staters traveled to Kansas Territory under the auspices of the New England Emigrant Aid Company to found a Free-State town. Led by Isaac Goodnow, the first members of the group (with the help of Samuel C. Pomeroy) selected the location of the Polistra and Canton claims for the Aid Company's new settlement. Soon after the New Englanders arrived at the site, in April 1855, they agreed to join Canton and Polistra to make one settlement named Boston. They were soon joined by dozens more New Englanders, including Goodnow's brother-in-law Joseph Denison.

In June 1855, the paddle steamer Hartford, carrying 75 settlers from Ohio, ran aground in the Kansas River near the settlement. The Ohio settlers, who were members of the Cincinnati-Manhattan Company, had been headed  farther upstream to the headwaters of the Kansas River, the location today of Junction City. After realizing they were stranded, the Hartford passengers accepted an invitation to join the new town, but insisted that it be renamed Manhattan, which was done on June 29, 1855. Manhattan was incorporated on May 30, 1857.

Early events

Early Manhattan settlers sometimes conflicted with Native Americans, and the town was threatened by pro-slavery Southerners. Manhattan was staunchly Free-State, and it elected the only two Free-State legislators to the first Territorial Legislature, commonly called the "Bogus Legislature". However, nearby Fort Riley protected the settlement from the major violence visited upon other Free-State towns during the "Bleeding Kansas" era. This allowed the town to develop relatively quickly. On January 30, 1858, Territorial Governor James W. Denver signed an act naming Manhattan as county seat for Riley County. Ten days later, on February 9, 1858, Governor Denver chartered a Methodist college in Manhattan, named Blue Mont Central College.

The young city received another boost when gold was discovered in the Rocky Mountains in 1859 and Fifty-Niners began to stream through Manhattan on their way to prospect in the mountains. Manhattan was one of the last significant settlements on the route west, and the village's merchants did a brisk business selling supplies to miners. Manhattan's first newspaper, The Kansas Express, began publishing on May 21, 1859.

In 1861, when the State of Kansas entered the Union, Isaac Goodnow, who had been a teacher in Rhode Island, began lobbying the legislature to convert Manhattan's Blue Mont Central College into the state university. The culmination of these efforts came on February 16, 1863, when the Kansas legislature established Kansas State Agricultural College (now Kansas State University) in Manhattan. When the college began its first session on September 2, 1863, it was the first public college in Kansas, the nation's first land-grant institution created under the Morrill Act, and only the second public institution of higher learning to admit women and men equally in the United States.

By the time the Kansas Pacific Railroad laid its tracks west through Manhattan in 1866, the 11-year-old settlement was permanently ensconced in the tallgrass prairie. Manhattan's population has grown every decade since its founding.

20th century
The town received the All-America City Award in 1952, the first in Kansas.

21st century
In 2007, CNN and Money magazine rated Manhattan as one of the ten best places in America to retire young.   In 2011, Forbes rated Manhattan No. 1 for "Best Small Communities for a Business and Career".

Geography

Geographic features

Manhattan is in the Flint Hills region of Kansas, which consists of continuous rolling hills covered in tall grasses. However, the downtown area – Manhattan's original site – was built on a broad, flat floodplain at the junction of the Kansas and Big Blue rivers. Manhattan is the largest town in the Flint Hills, and is home to the Flint Hills Discovery Center.

The lake was formed when the Big Blue River was dammed for flood control in the 1960s, and it is now a state park that offers many recreational opportunities. South of the city is the Konza Prairie, a tallgrass prairie preserve owned by The Nature Conservancy and Kansas State University.

Earthquakes
Kansas is not known for earthquake activity, but Manhattan is near the Nemaha Ridge, a long structure bounded by several faults, and which is still active. In particular, the Humboldt Fault Zone lies just  eastward of Tuttle Creek Reservoir.

On April 24, 1867, the 1867 Manhattan earthquake struck Riley County. Measuring 5.1 on the Richter magnitude scale, the earthquake's epicenter was by Manhattan. It caused largely minor damage, reports of which were confined to Kansas, Iowa, and Missouri, according to the United States Geological Survey.

Although Kansas is not seismically active, a strong earthquake could pose significant threats to the state. If an earthquake had occurred along the Nemaha Ridge prior to 2010, it could have destroyed the dam on Tuttle Creek Reservoir, releasing  of water per second and flooding the nearby area, threatening roughly 13,000 people and 5,900 homes. A study in the 1980s found a moderate earthquake "between 5.7 to 6.6 would cause sand underneath the dam to liquefy into quicksand, causing the dam to spread out and the top to drop up to three feet." To address this threat, the Army Corps of Engineers completed a project in July 2010 that replaced the sand with more than 350 concrete walls and equipped the dam with sensors. Alarms are connected to these sensors, which would alert nearby citizens to the earthquake.

Climate
Manhattan has a humid continental climate (Köppen Dfa), typically experiencing hot, humid summers and cold, dry winters. The high temperature reaches or exceeds  an average of 58 days a year and  an average of 10 days. The minimum temperature falls to or below  on an average 5.3 days a year.

On average, Manhattan receives  of precipitation annually, a majority of which occurs from May to August, and records 102 days of measurable precipitation. Measurable snowfall occurs an average of 9.6 days per year with 6.1 days receiving at least . Snow depth of at least one inch occurs an average of 22 days a year. Typically, the average window for freezing temperatures is October 12 through April 21.

Tornadoes

The state of Kansas falls within an area sometimes called Tornado Alley.  The most destructive tornado in Manhattan touched down at approximately 10:30 pm on June 11, 2008. Thirty-one homes and several businesses were destroyed by the EF4 tornado. Kansas State University's campus incurred about $20 million in damage – a number of university buildings sustained significant damage and the tornado's winds destroyed the Wind Erosion Laboratory's garage. No one was killed.

Previously, the most destructive tornado to hit Manhattan was on June 8, 1966. The 1966 tornado caused $5 million in damage and injured at least 65 people in Manhattan.

Flooding

Manhattan was built on a floodplain at the junction of the Kansas and Big Blue rivers, and it has faced recurring problems with flooding from heavy precipitation. The worst floods were the 1903 and 1908 floods, the Great Flood of 1951, and the Great Flood of 1993. In 2019, record amounts of rainfall in Kansas brought water levels up massive amounts and flood records were broken that had not been seen since 1993. Tuttle Creek Reservoir recorded its second highest flood level ever on May 31 at 1,135.80 feet above sea-level. The only level higher came from The Great Flood of 1993, which recorded an astounding 1,138 feet above sea-level on July 23. The top of the emergency Spillway gates measures at 1,136 feet, only 0.2 feet above the 2019 record lake level. The only time that the emergency Spillway gates have ever been opened was on July 19, 1993, at 3:15 PM. The gates were opened 0.8 feet which allowed 10,000 cubic feet per second of water to move through the downstream channel. The gates were slowly opened more each day until July 23 at a peak 60,000 cubic feet per second (450,000 gallons per second). The gates remained open until August 9, 1993. The normal level for Tuttle Creek Reservoir averages 1,075 feet.

Demographics

Manhattan is the principal city of the Manhattan metropolitan area which, as of 2014, had an estimated population of 98,091. It is also the principal city of the Manhattan-Junction City, Kansas Combined Statistical Area which, as of 2014, had an estimated population of 134,804, making it the fourth largest urban area in Kansas.

2010 census
As of the census of 2010, there were 52,281 people, 20,008 households, and 9,466 families residing in the city. The racial makeup was 83.5% Caucasian, 5.5% African American, 0.5% Native American, 5.1% Asian, 0.2% Pacific Islander, 1.7% from other races, and 3.5% from two or more races. Hispanic or Latino of any race were 5.8% of the population.

There were 20,008 households, of which 22.3% had children under the age of 18 living with them, 36.0% were married couples living together, 8.2% had a female householder with no husband present, 3.1% had a male householder with no wife present, and 52.7% were non-families. 30.3% of all households were made up of individuals, and 5.9% had someone living alone who was 65 years of age or older. The average household size was 2.30 and the average family size was 2.82.

The population was spread out, with 15.3% of residents under the age of 18; 39.1% between the ages of 18 and 24; 24% from 25 to 44; 14.2% from 45 to 64; and 7.5% who were 65 years of age or older. The median age was 23.8 years. The gender makeup of the city was 50.9% male and 49.1% female.

2000 census
As of the census of 2000, there were 44,831 people, 16,949 households, and 8,254 families residing in the city. The racial makeup was 87.28% White, 4.86% African American, 0.48% Native American, 3.93% Asian, 0.07% Pacific Islander, 1.30% from other races, and 2.07% from two or more races. Hispanic or Latino of any race were 3.49% of the population.

There were 16,949 households, out of which 22.7% had children under the age of 18 living with them, 39.6% were married couples living together, 6.6% had a female householder with no husband present, and 51.3% were non-families. 30.5% of all households were made up of individuals, and 6.3% had someone living alone who was 65 years of age or older. The average household size was 2.30 and the average family size was 2.89.

The population was spread out, with 15.8% under the age of 18, 39.2% from 18 to 24, 24.0% from 25 to 44, 13.2% from 45 to 64, and 7.8% who were 65 years of age or older. The median age was 24 years. For every 100 females, there were 106.4 males. For every 100 females age 18 and over, there were 105.4 males.

The median income for a household was $30,463, and the median income for a family was $48,289. Males had a median income of $31,396 versus $24,611 for females. The per capita income was $16,566. About 8.7% of families and 24.2% of the population were below the poverty line, including 10.1% of those under age 18 and 7.8% of those age 65 or over. However, traditional measures of income and poverty can be misleading when applied to cities with high student populations, such as Manhattan.

Economy
Manhattan's economy is heavily based on the public sector. Kansas State University is the largest employer in town, and its approximately 24,000 students help support the retail and entertainment venues in the city. The second-largest employer in Manhattan is the city school district. Additionally, many civilians and military personnel employed at nearby Fort Riley also live in Manhattan and support its economy, including more than 3,500 civilian Fort Riley employees. Finally, most of the 150 employees in the Kansas Department of Agriculture work in a new office building in Manhattan, next to the National Bio and Agro-Defense Facility (NBAF).

Large private sector employers in Manhattan include the Ascension Via Christi Hospitals, CivicPlus, and Farm Bureau. Manhattan also features a small industrial base.  Manufacturing and commercial businesses include: GTM Sportswear, Florence Corporation, Manko Windows, Parker Hannifin, the McCall Pattern Company, Ultra Electronics-ICE,  and Farrar Corporation.

The Steel & Pipe Supply Co. began in Manhattan in 1933, with corporate headquarters in the city although it has moved its fabrication and distribution to other locations.

Future growth
In 2009, the United States Department of Homeland Security announced that it would locate the National Bio and Agro-Defense Facility (NBAF) in Manhattan.  The NBAF is scheduled to open in 2022, and will be a federal lab to research biological threats involving human, zoonotic (i.e., transmitted from animals to humans) and foreign animal diseases.  It is expected to employ between 250 and 350 people, including researchers, technical support and operations specialists.

Historic businesses
Manhattan's Tallgrass Brewing Co was the largest brewery in Kansas until it ceased operations in 2018. The former Dickinson Theatres chain began in Manhattan in 1920, and grew to operate in seven states before it was purchased in 2014.

Government

Local
Manhattan is governed under a council-manager system, with a five-member City Commission. Elections are nonpartisan and are held every other year, in odd-numbered years. Three City Commission positions are chosen in each election. The two highest vote recipients receive four-year terms, while the third highest vote recipient receives a two-year term. The highest vote winner in a general election is established to serve as mayor on the third year of a four-year term. The Mayor presides over Commission meetings, but has the same voting rights as other Commissioners and no veto power.  As of 2022, Linda Morse serves as the city's mayor.

State
Manhattan is located inside several state district boundaries.  Most of Manhattan falls within two districts for the Kansas House of Representatives.  Representative Tom Phillips (R) serves in District 67, which includes portions of south, west, and northern Riley County.  Representative Sydney Carlin (D) represents District 66, which includes most of downtown Manhattan, and the northeastern portions of the city.  Small portions of Manhattan extend into other districts to the south and north.

Manhattan is the Kansas Senate District 22, and the state senator is Democrat Tom Hawk.

Federal
Manhattan is located in Kansas's 1st congressional district, which is represented by Republican Tracey Mann.  Manhattan was moved from the 2nd District to the 1st District during redistricting in 2012.  Manhattan had been placed originally in the 1st District when the state was subdivided in 1874. John Alexander Anderson of Manhattan served as the district's second Congressional representative, from 1879 to 1885.

A majority of voters in Riley County never supported a Democratic candidate for president, until Joe Biden won the county in the 2020 election. Republicans have carried Riley County in every previous presidential election, except for 1912, when a majority of the county's voters supported the Progressive candidate Theodore Roosevelt.

Education

Colleges and universities

Kansas State University is the largest employer and educational institution in the city of Manhattan with nearly 24,000 students. KSU is home to Wildcat sports and to nationally recognized academics. It has ranked first nationally among state universities in its total of Rhodes, Marshall, Truman, Goldwater, and Udall scholars since 1986.

Manhattan is home to Manhattan Christian College, Manhattan Area Technical College, the American Institute of Baking, The Flint Hills Job Corps Training Center, and the Kansas Building Science Institute.

Primary and secondary education
Manhattan is served by Manhattan-Ogden USD 383 public school district and has one public high school with two campuses (Manhattan High School), two middle schools (Susan B. Anthony and Dwight D. Eisenhower), and eight elementary schools (Amanda Arnold, Frank V. Bergman, Bluemont, Lee, Marlatt, Northview, Theodore Roosevelt and Woodrow Wilson).  The city also has two private school systems: Flint Hills Christian School (Preschool – 12th grade) and the Manhattan Catholic Schools. Manhattan Catholic School contains two buildings, the grade school building (K-5)and the Luckey Jr. High building (6–8), formerly called the Luckey high building dedicated to Monsignor Luckey. The school's mascot is "Luckey the Cardinal".

Sites of interest
The Marianna Kistler Beach Museum of Art and the Kansas State University Gardens are on the campus of Kansas State University. Next to the campus is Aggieville with shopping and bars.

Manhattan's Sunset Zoo is accredited by the Association of Zoos and Aquariums (AZA). Colbert Hills Golf Course, which is annually ranked by Golf Digest among the best in the state, is home to the Earl Woods National Youth Golf Academy and a host site for The First Tee program. Manhattan is the birthplace of Damon Runyon, the "Inventor of Broadway", and his Manhattan house is listed on the National Register of Historic Places.

The buildings for The Flint Hills Job Corps Training Center west of the city were once used as a nursing home and orphanage operated by the Fraternal Order of Odd Fellows.

The first capitol of the Kansas Territory is preserved nearby, on Fort Riley grounds. Since 2006 it has, once again, become home to the Big Red One, the 1st Infantry Division of the United States.

As the largest municipality in the Flint Hills region, Manhattan is host to the Flint Hills Discovery Center, a heritage and science center dedicated to the education and preservation of the Flint Hills and the remaining tall grass prairie.

Culture

Manhattan was rated by CNN Money as one of the top ten places to retire young.

Aggieville is a center of shopping and nightlife with many stores, bars, and live bands. Downtown Manhattan, and the Manhattan Town Center Mall, are an anchor for shopping, art, fine dining, and entertainment in eastern Manhattan.

Kansas State University's school sessions greatly impact Manhattan culture. Bill Snyder Family Football Stadium, Bramlage Coliseum, and McCain Auditorium host national events, including lectures and concerts. Marianna Kistler Beach Museum of Art hosts the university's permanent art collection and traveling art exhibits.

Transportation
In 2009, the Manhattan, Kansas, metropolitan statistical area (MSA) ranked as the fifth highest in the United States for percentage of commuters who walked to work (8.5 percent).

Airports

The airport is served by American Airlines subsidiary American Eagle, which offers multiple flights daily to Chicago's O'Hare International Airport and the Dallas/Fort Worth International Airport, as well as handling general aviation and charter flights. The nearest larger commercial airports are in Kansas City (MCI) and Wichita, Kansas (ICT).

Rail

Domestic passenger rail service to Manhattan began on August 20, 1866, on the Kansas Pacific Railroad line. A mainline of the Union Pacific Railroad still passes through the city, but all passenger service to Manhattan was discontinued after the Amtrak takeover of passenger rail in 1971.

The Rock Island Railroad also formerly served Manhattan as a stop on Rock Island's Kansas City–Colorado Springs Rocky Mountain Rocket service. The Rock Island depot was located between Fifth and Sixth streets, along former El Paso Street (now Fort Riley Boulevard).  The former railroad right-of-way was converted to Manhattan's main southern east-west arterial road, Fort Riley Boulevard, as well as a rail-trail, linear park up the Wildcat Creek valley through Manhattan's west side.

Intercity bus service
Intercity bus service, previously provided by Greyhound Lines and KCI Roadrunner, was discontinued years ago.  However, Arrow Stage Line operates charter service out of local facilities on McCall Road.

Public transportation
Within the City of Manhattan, limited mass-transit is provided by Riley County's subsidized paratransit service, ATA Bus. ATA Bus recently started its first set-route bus route in Manhattan connecting an apartment complex and an office campus, and is currently working with the city to develop a feasible mass-transit system. ATA uses four small buses and a number of minivans in its fleet. Five twenty-passenger transit buses have been purchased for fixed-route service and the agency is awaiting operational funding from Kansas State University and the City.

Historically, the city operated a streetcar system from 1909 to 1928.  The trolley tracks were torn up and replaced by bus service in 1928, which was later also discontinued.

Highways
Manhattan is served by several highways:
Three exits have a direct connection to Manhattan.
 Exit 313 – K-177
 Exit 307 – McDowell Creek Road
 Exit 303 – K-18
  runs through Manhattan.  East on 24 is Wamego, west is Clay Center. US-24 comes in from Clay Center, runs north of the city, turns into a four-lane highway near Tuttle Creek State Park and travels south into the city as Tuttle Creek Boulevard until an intersection with East Poyntz Avenue, and then turns northeast towards Wamego.
  runs north from I-70 as Bill Snyder Highway until the Kansas River viaduct. A half-leaf interchange with K-18 (Tuttle Creek Blvd. and Ft. Riley Blvd.) and officially ends at the intersection with U.S. Route 24 in Manhattan.
  is a major connector in Manhattan. It runs through Wabaunsee and Zeandale to K-177, crosses to Kansas River, and runs west toward the Manhattan Regional Airport and Ogden. It then travels south to I-70 as a major gateway to Manhattan.
  (Seth Child Road) runs from K-18 in southern Manhattan to US-24, passing through the western areas of the City.

Historically, Manhattan was located on the national Victory Highway, one of the original 1920s auto trails.  With the creation of the numbered federal highway system in 1926, the highway became U.S. Route 40.  From 1926 to 1935, Route 40 diverged west out of Manhattan into "40N" and "40S" routes; the two routes met again in Limon, Colorado.

In the 1950s, Route 40 was rerouted nine miles south of Manhattan, due to security concerns that originally arose during World War II about the highway passing through neighboring Fort Riley. The new route followed a more direct line between Topeka and Junction City, and in 1956 it was designated as Interstate 70.

Media

The Manhattan Mercury is the city's main newspaper, published six days a week. Other newspapers published in the city include:  the alternative weekly The Hype Weekly which focuses on events, arts, and culture in the area; the weekly Manhattan Free Press; the agriculture-oriented Grass & Grain; and the K-State university newspaper, the Kansas State Collegian. Manhattan has had at least one newspaper published for the town continuously since The Kansas Express published its first edition on May 21, 1859.

Manhattan is a center of broadcast media for the surrounding area. One AM and ten FM radio stations are licensed to and/or broadcast from the city. Manhattan lies within the Topeka, Kansas, television market, and six stations are licensed to and/or broadcast from the city including:  a translator of KTWU, the PBS member station in Topeka; K-State's station KKSU-LD; two GCN translators; and two independent stations.

The first television station in Kansas was W9XAK in Manhattan, licensed to broadcast by the Federal Radio Commission on March 9, 1932.

Notable people

Twin and sister cities
  Dobřichovice, Czech Republic (2006).
 In August 2004, the Manhattan City Commission established an advisory committee to explore and foster a formal partnership with an international city. In 2005, following a lengthy planning effort guided by Dr. Joseph Barton-Dobenin, a Czech native and now-retired professor at Kansas State University, then-Commissioner Ed Klimek visited Dobřichovice to initiate a partnership with that city. After Klimek's visit, Dobřichovice community leaders visited Manhattan to continue the effort towards establishing the formal relationship. In 2006, the Committee recommended, and the City Commission chose, the City of Dobřichovice as its partner city, and in April, then-Mayor Ed Klimek signed a Partner Cities Agreement to formally make the two cities partner cities.

See also

 Johnny Kaw – fictional character styled for Paul Bunyan
 Freedom's Frontier National Heritage Area
 June 1966 tornado outbreak sequence
 Great Flood of 1951

References

Further reading

 Olson, Kevin G. W. Frontier Manhattan: Yankee Settlement to Kansas Town, 1854–1894 (University Press of Kansas, 2012) 273 pp.

External links

 
 Manhattan – Directory of Public Officials
 Manhattan – Convention and Visitor's Bureau
 Manhattan Chamber of Commerce
 Manhattan city map, KDOT

 
Cities in Kansas
County seats in Kansas
Cities in Pottawatomie County, Kansas
Cities in Riley County, Kansas
Populated places established in 1855
1855 establishments in Kansas Territory
Manhattan, Kansas metropolitan area